The Société centrale canine, officially the Société Centrale Canine pour l'Amélioration des Races de Chiens en France and abbreviated SCC, is a French kennel club founded in 1881. It is made up of regional clubs and breed clubs, and coordinates and regulates activities and connections between governmental groups and dog clubs, as well as activities through the Fédération cynologique internationale, where it was one of the original five founding member organizations in 1911.

History
The SCC was founded in 1881, to sponsor dog shows in France as The Kennel Club was doing in England.

In 1885, the Book of French Origin (Livre des origines français, L.O.F.) for the preservation of native dog breeds was begun through the SCC. In 1957, the French Ministry of Agriculture recognised the L.O.F. with other animal records, and it became the official French listing for purebred dogs. Today, all purebred dogs are listed in this register, subject to checking and restrictions. The parent dogs must be certified for breeding, and the puppy certified by inspection of an SCC judge between 10 and 15 months of age. French legal code allows only L.O.F. certified and registered dogs to be sold as purebred. Stud books for specific breeds within the L.O.F. may be either open or closed, and there is a mechanism for recognising dogs with unregistered parents, by visual inspection. After three generations (number of generations set by law) the descendants are registered without additional separate inspections.

Organization
The SCC has a President with four vice-presidents, a secretary-general and adjunct, and a treasurer and adjunct. There is a 26 member committee, made up of representatives from regional kennel clubs, breed clubs, and dog activity clubs. Reporting to the committee is a general assembly from all of the regional and specialty clubs, with one member for every 50 to 300 members of the club being represented.
In addition, there are commissions for education, scientific research, judges' training and the L.O.F., shows, and many other topics of interest to dog fanciers.

Titles
Société centrale canine dog show titles and terms used in French dog shows:

CACS : Certificate of conformation to the breed standard 
CACIB : Certificate of fitness for an International Conformation Championship
BOB / BOG : Best Of Breed / Best Of Group)
BIS : Best In Show
Ch.Int. or CHIB : International Champion
TAN : Test of natural aptitude (working degree) 
CACT : Certificate of working championship
CACIT : Certificate of International working championship
CHIT : International working champion (Champion International Travail) 
CHTGT : Champion Work on Drawn Game (Champion Travail sur Gibier Tiré) 
TR : Trialer (for this title the "dog must receive an Excellent rating in both a spring and fall field trial plus an Excellent rating in a conformation show")

See also
 Fédération Cynologique Internationale
 Dog sports

References

External links

Dog sports
Fédération Cynologique Internationale
Kennel clubs
Dogs in France
1881 establishments in France
Organizations established in 1881
Dog breeds originating in France